Rhopalocarpus similis is a tree in the family Sphaerosepalaceae. It is endemic to Madagascar.

Distribution and habitat
Rhopalocarpus similis is a widespread species in Madagascar. Its habitat is both dry and wet forests and thickets from sea-level to  altitude. Some populations are within protected areas.

Threats
Rhopalocarpus similis is threatened by shifting patterns of agriculture, resulting in deforestation. Because the species is used as timber and firewood, subsistence harvesting is also a threat. Wildfires also pose a threat.

References

similis
Endemic flora of Madagascar
Trees of Madagascar
Plants described in 1903